= Ammanakeri =

Village in Karnataka, India

Coordinates: 14°52′N 76°25′E

Ammanakeri is a village in the southern state of Karnataka, India.

== See also ==
- Bellary
- Districts of Karnataka
